Sidney Dillon Ripley (January 11, 1863 – February 24, 1905) was an American insurance executive and prominent member of New York society during the Gilded Age.

Early life
He was the son of Josiah Dwight Ripley and Julia Elizabeth (née Dillon) Ripley. After his father's death, his mother remarried to Gilman Smith Moulton on March 1, 1894.  His younger brothers were Harry Dillon Ripley and Louis Arthur Dillon Ripley, the father of Julie Ripley Forman (founder of the Forman School), and Sidney Dillon Ripley II, an ornithologist who served as Secretary of the Smithsonian Institution and married Mary Livingston of the prominent Livingston family.

His paternal grandfather was Sidney Dillon, the financier and builder of the Union Pacific Railroad who served as its first president.  Following his grandfather's death, who left an estate valued at $6,000,000, he received bequests giving him an annual income of $60,000. Dillon came "from several Colonial families of Massachusetts and Connecticut. His American ancestor was William Ripley, who, with his wife, two sons and two daughters, came in one of the earliest companies of Colonists from Hingham, Norfolk County, England, and settled in Hingham, Massachusetts in 1638."

Career
Beginning in 1885, Ripley worked for The Equitable Life Assurance Society, eventually serving as the corporate treasurer and a director for 13 years.  He also served as a director of the First National Bank of Hemstead, L.I., the Manganese Steele Safe Company, the Mercantile Trust Company, the Mount Morris Bank, and the Taylor Iron and Steel Company.

Society life
In 1892, Ripley and his wife were both included in Ward McAllister's "Four Hundred", purported to be an index of New York's best families, published in The New York Times.  Conveniently, 400 was the number of people that could fit into Mrs. Astor's ballroom.  He was a member of the Meadow Brook Hunt Club, the Metropolitan Club, the Chamber of Commerce, the New York Zoological Society, the New York Mycological Society, the Coney Island Jockey Club, the University Club, the Lawyers' Club, the Racquet Club, the Country Club, the South Side Sportsmen's Club, the Rockaway Hunting Club, the Automobile Club and the Turf and Field Clubs.

Residences

The Ripley's had a 48-room country home in Hempstead on Long Island (which is today across from Hofstra University at California and Fulton Avenues), known as "Crossways."

In 1901, Ripley had commissioned Warren & Wetmore them a 35-wide mansion in New York's Upper East Side at 16 East 79th Street.  The five-story brick-and-limestone Georgian home, that featured a columned portico and two-step porch, was completed shortly before his death in 1905.  In 1912, his widow sold their New York City residence, which was described by The New York Times as the "dwelling occupies a plot 35 by 102.2 feet in the choicest upper Fifth Avenue residential section", for $400,000.  After she sold the residence, she moved to 101 East 72nd Street.

Personal life 
On October 14, 1885, Ripley was married to Mary Baldwin Hyde (1867–1938).  Mary was the daughter of Henry Baldwin Hyde, the founder of Equitable Life Assurance, and Annie (née Fitch) Hyde, and the sister of James Hazen Hyde. Together, they were the parents of:

 Annah Dillon Ripley (1886–1963), who married Count Pierre Joseph de Viel Castel (1875–1950), a grandson of Count Horace de Viel-Castel, in 1910. They lived at 4 Avenue Marceau in Paris.
 Henry Baldwin Hyde Ripley (–1959), who married Lesley Frederica Pearson, daughter of Commander Frederick Pearson and grand-niece of James Cook Ayer, in 1919.
 Sidney Dillon Ripley Jr. (1891–1970), a prominent real‐estate broker who married Betsy Ann Sherry.
 James Hazen Ripley (–1977), who married Marguerite Doubleday (1901–1932) in 1925.  After his first wife's death, he remarried to Gladys Livermore in 1934.

In 1895, Ripley and James Lorillard Kernochan (son of James Powell Kernochan) were arrested in Hempstead for playing golf, on a Sunday, on the greens opposite the clubhouse at the Meadow Brook Hunt Club.

In 1899, he urged his brother, Harry Dillon Ripley, to take charge of his financial affairs after Hyde had run into debt of $100,000.  Just before Ripley died, Harry sued Sidney and the Knickerbocker Trust Company alleging "misconduct in managing his property." After his death, the Supreme Court of New York Referee conducted an investigation and found that "the trust had been well and faithfully administered" and Sidney and the Knickerbocker Trust were exonerated and relieved of their duties.

Ripley died of appendicitis on February 24, 1905.  His will was quickly probated and his estate, valued in excess of $5,000,000, was left to his family.  His wife received their Long Island home, and all "jewelry, horses, carriages, and harness, and all property of the deceased for life." All of the funds in trust he inherited from his grandfather passed to his children.  His wife received $848,505 and each of his children received $74,614 directly.

After his death, his widow remarried to Charles R. Scott, a Hong Kong-based British banker who was the son of Col. Robert Scott of the Irish Fusiliers, in Bar Harbor, Maine in 1912.

Descendants
Through his daughter, he was the grandfather of Marie Bonne de Viel Castel (1914–1997), who married Eugene Bowie Roberts Jr. in 1965; Pierre Etienne de Viel Castel (1917–2012); and Édouard Louis de Viel Castel (1911–1968).

Through his son Henry, he was the grandfather of Henry Baldwin Hyde Ripley Jr. (1924–1998), who married Ethel Lachicotte Boyle, and Malcolm Pennington Ripley (1927–2005).

References
Notes

Sources

External links
 
 Miniature portrait of Mrs. Sidney Dillon Ripley, by Fernand Paillet, 1889.
 Architectural article about 16 East 79th Street.

1863 births
1905 deaths
People from the Upper East Side
People included in New York Society's Four Hundred